Engjëll Berisha (1926 – 15 September 2010), also known as Befre, was a Kosovar painter from Kosovo.

Berisha was born in 1926 in Peć, Kosovo. He graduated from the University of Belgrade in 1954. He was a member of the Academy of Figurative Arts of Kosovo. Some of his paintings adorn the National Library of Kosovo and the library of the University of Pristina. He died on 15 September 2010, aged 84, in Pristina, Kosovo.

Works
Dardan Gate
Tower of Dukagjini
Symbols

References

Albanian painters
1926 births
Kosovan painters
University of Belgrade alumni
2010 deaths
Kosovo Albanians
People from Peja